Turoa (or Tūroa) is a skifield on the south western side of Mount Ruapehu, the highest mountain in the North Island of New Zealand, in Tongariro National Park. The area has been used for skiing since before the completion of the Mountain Road, but the first lifts opened in 1978.

There are two beginner areas, and many intermediate and advanced trails. The upper field is a mix of natural pipes, steep drops, fast plains, and easier slopes, along with several terrain parks. The lower field contains the field's single narrow beginner trail, Clarry's Track, and a few other intermediate trails. They also serve as access to the base area from the upper mountain, and are often crowded.

The skifield is reached via the Mountain Road from the town of Ohakune. The Mountain Road was built by locals from Ohakune, mostly during weekends after they formed the Mountain Road Association in 1952. Their aim was to open Ruapehu's southern slopes for skiing, partly as a replacement industry for the decline in logging which had sustained the town for the previous decades. The now renamed Ministry of Works helped with the road on one occasion by 'misplacing' a culvert destined for another roading project. The 17 kilometre road was opened in 1963. It winds up through spectacular native forest before breaking out above the tree line and finishes at a complex of carparks below the bottom chairlift.

Turoa has been owned by Ruapehu Alpine Lifts since 2000, which also owns the nearby Whakapapa skifield, also on Mt. Ruapehu. It is possible to traverse from one field to the other. The two are operated together, with a combined lift ticket for both fields. Together, they are considered to be the largest ski resort in New Zealand and possibly the southern hemisphere.

On a good day it is possible to hike to the top of the mountain with skis or snowboard in hand, view the Crater Lake, and then ski back down to the field, or to Whakapapa. Also on a clear day Mount Taranaki can be seen.

In 1995, skiers were evacuated from the skifield when a small volcanic eruption occurred at the crater lake, ejecting rocks, ash and steam.

In 2007, a high speed six-seater chairlift, the High Noon Express was installed, replacing an existing T-bar to the top of the mountain.  The lift had several faults after being installed, such as cable derailments.  In winter of 2010, two pylons on the lift collapsed, and the lift was redesigned with 15 new shorter pylons instead of 10 higher pylons in the original design and was open 2011 season.  The redesign required relocating an older fixed grip quad chair which previously passed under the lift.

Voluntary administration 
In 2022 following a poor snow season attributed largely to climate change, Ruapehu Alpine Lifts, the parent company of both Whakapapa  and Turoa skifields, entered voluntary administration in an attempt to avoid bankruptcy.  The company is a not-for-profit business that was established by members of ski clubs in 1953. In August 2022, Ruapehu Alpine Lifts laid off 130 workers  and its total debt climbed to over NZ$30 million. The financial situation of Ruapehu Alpine Lifts deteriorated rapidly following disruptions from the COVID-19 pandemic. Efforts to secure additional funds from investors or the New Zealand government initially failed.

However, in December 2022, the government provided a $6 million loan to Ruapehu Alpine Lifts, to help ensure that both Ruapehu skifields could operate in winter 2023. This was in addition to $15 million provided in 2018 from the Provincial Growth Fund.

Lifts
There are three proposed ski lifts at Turoa, which are due to be complete before 2030. A new Quad express set to be positioned west of the high noon express, to give better access to where the old Jumbo T-Bar used to operate near. The existing Giant fixed grip chairlift is set to be replaced by a new detachable quad express.  A gondola is planned to be constructed on Turoa, replacing both the Parklane and Movenpick chairs, starting at the base area and terminating at the location of the top station of the Movenpick chair with a mid station allowing for access to the Wintergarden beginners area.

The lifts are capable of taking up to 11,300 people per hour on a busy day, the second most of any ski area in New Zealand, behind Whakapapa. A new high speed six-seater chairlift was added for the winter of 2007, replacing an existing t-bar to the top of the mountain.

References

External links
 Mt Ruapehu - Tūroa

Ski areas and resorts in New Zealand
Sports venues in Manawatū-Whanganui